Wharariki Beach is a beach on the Tasman Sea, west of Cape Farewell, the northernmost point of the South Island of New Zealand.

The north-facing sandy beach is accessible only via a 21-minute walking track from the end of Wharariki Road. A camping ground is located along Wharariki Road, but the area surrounding the beach is devoid of any development. Wharariki Beach is bordered by Puponga Farm Park, with the wider area more or less surrounded by the northern end of Kahurangi National Park.

The beach is flanked to the east and west by cliffs, but due to the flat topography of the area behind it, the beach area and the grassy dunes behind it are quite exposed to winds.

Wharariki Beach is perhaps best known for the Archway Islands, featured frequently in photos in New Zealand landscape calendars. It is also the default lock screen image and one of the desktop wallpapers on Microsoft's Windows 10 operating system.

Archway Islands

The largest of the islands is closest to the mainland and adjoins Wharariki Beach; it is generally not cut off by the sea.

References

Beaches of the Tasman District